Luke Francis Campbell (born 2 October 1992) is a Canadian rugby union player who generally plays as a number eight represents Canada internationally and also currently plays for Old Glory DC of Major League Rugby (MLR).

He previously played for Canadian club Toronto Arrows in the MLR. 

He was included in the Canadian squad for the 2019 Rugby World Cup which is held in Japan for the first time and also marks his first World Cup appearance.

Career 
He made his international debut for Canada against United States on 10 February 2018. He made his first World Cup match appearance against Italy on 26 September 2019 in Canada's opening match of the tournament in Pool B. The match ended up in a losing cause for Canada, where Italy thrashed them in a one sided contest by scoring 48–7.

References 

1992 births
Living people
Canadian rugby union players
Canada international rugby union players
Rugby union number eights
Sportspeople from Victoria, British Columbia
BC Bears players
Toronto Arrows players
Old Glory DC players
Rugby union flankers